Rules and Regulations is the second studio album by British grime group Roll Deep and it was released in 2007 on Roll Deep Recordings. The album features grime MCs who were not members of the crew, such as Tempa T and Frisco, much more than their first album.

Track listing

References

Roll Deep Interview with ukhh.com
BBC Review of Rules and Regulations

2007 albums
Roll Deep albums